Merstone railway station, was an intermediate station situated on the edge of Merstone village on the line from Newport to Sandown incorporated by the Isle of Wight (Newport Junction) Railway in 1868

History
It opened in 1875 and closed 81 years later. In 1897 a new line opened from Merstone to provide an alternative route to the south-east corner of the island, running initially to St Lawrence and in 1900 to Ventnor West station . Located in the heart of a farming community, Merstone was snowed under during the harsh winter of 1947. The station building was demolished after closure, although the platform is still existent.  Merstone station is now an access point onto National Cycle Route 23

Stationmasters
Martin Conlan ca. 1881
H. Frank Williams until 1897 (formerly station master at Newport)
Frederick Newland from 1897  
J. Cooper ca. 1908 
Fred Rowlands ca. 1910 
Fred Mew ca. 1915
Mr. Wheway ca. 1935

See also 

 List of closed railway stations in Britain

References

External links 
  Subterranea Britannica's page on Merstone

Disused railway stations on the Isle of Wight
Former Isle of Wight Central Railway stations
Railway stations in Great Britain opened in 1875
Railway stations in Great Britain closed in 1956